Mill Creek is a stream in Ste. Genevieve County in the U.S. state of Missouri. It is a tributary of River aux Vases.

Mill Creek was named for the mills lining its banks.

See also
List of rivers of Missouri

References

Rivers of Ste. Genevieve County, Missouri
Rivers of Missouri